Fray Don Juan ("Friar Don Juan" in English) is a 1970 Mexican sex comedy film directed by René Cardona Jr. and starring Mauricio Garcés in dual roles, one as a priest and the other as a womanizer. It also stars Lorena Velázquez, Norma Lazareno, Gina Romand, Barbara Angely, and Luis Manuel Pelayo. It is one in a series of films that featured Garcés as an upper middle class ladies' man.

Plot
A Dominican friar is wrapped in a tangled plot because he is mistaken for his estranged twin brother, who is a womanizer.

Cast
Mauricio Garcés as Juan Primero / Juan Segundo
Lorena Velázquez as Claudia, the Pilot's wife
Norma Lazareno as Graveyard Lady
Gina Romand as Caridad la de Camagüey
Barbara Warren as Supermarket Lady (credited as Barbara Angely)
Luis Manuel Pelayo as Sócrates, the Butler
Carlos Agostí as The Pilot
Susana Salvat as Girl at church
Eduardo Alcaraz (credited as Eduardo Arcaraz)
Irlanda Mora as Bank Teller
Carlos Nieto as The Doctor
Enrique Pontón
Alma Thelma (credited as Alma Thelma Domínguez)
José Chávez
Miguel Ángel Gómez

References

External links

1970 films
1970s Spanish-language films
1970s sex comedy films
Mexican sex comedy films
Films directed by René Cardona Jr.
1970s Mexican films